Chamara Janaraj Peiris (චාමර ජනරාජ් පීරිස්; born 14 January 1970), is a Sri Lankan Journalist, Screenplay Writer, Teledrama Director and Filmmaker. He has produced several critically acclaimed television serials such as Piyavi, Ayal, Batahira Ahasa and Raahu. Currently he is the Creative Director of Pix and Words (Pvt) Ltd.

Personal life
Peiris was born on 14 January 1970 in Colombo as the only child of the family. He completed education from Royal College, Colombo. In his last year at the school, he was awarded the best student by the President. His father died on 17 March 2011.

Career
After completing education, he went Russia with a scholarship to obtain Bachelor of Science in Architecture from Moscow Architecture Academy in 1997. Then he completed MSc in Landscape Design from University of Moratuwa in 2003. He worked as SLBC correspondent in Moscow for six years from 1991 to 1997. When he was working as a journalist, he wrote a script for a teledrama and went to a well known director in Sri Lanka, but he refused.

In 2009, Peries directed his maiden television serial Ayal. Then he directed his next serial Piyavi in 2011 and Yaya 4 in 2012. All three serials were critically acclaimed and had 30 nominations in many local festivals. Since then, Peiris has contributed with many popular serials including Acid, VVIP, Batahira Ahasa and Raahu.

Apart from television serials, Peiris involved in many advertisements, documentary programs as well as a journalist in Associate Newspapers Ceylon Ltd. (ANCL) since 1997 to 2010. He wrote series of articles called 13th Page and articles on Extraterrestrial beings and the Theory of Universe published in Dinamina Newspaper. Then he worked as Director Programming for Stein Studios from 2016 to 2017. While working in ANCL, Peiris contributed in many positions such as administrative officer, managing editor, layout editor and graphic designer.

In 2019, he made his debut cinema direction with the film Uthuru Sulanga. The film was released on 29 April 2021.

Awards
Peiris has won and nominated for several awards at teledrama festivals for Best director and best script.

State Film Awards

|-
|| 2011 ||| Ayal || Best Teledrama Director ||  
|-
|| 2011 ||| Ayal || Best Teledrama Scriptwriter ||  
|-
|| 2012 ||| Piyavi || Best Teledrama Director ||  
|-
|| 2012 ||| Piyavi || Best Teledrama Scriptwriter ||  
|-
|| 2013 ||| Yaya 4 || Best Teledrama Scriptwriter ||

Raigam Tele'es

|-
|| 2010 ||| Ayal || Jury Special Award ||  
|-
|| 2010 ||| Ayal || Best Teledrama Scriptwriter ||  
|-
|| 2011 ||| Piyavi || Best Teledrama Scriptwriter ||  
|-
|| 2012 ||| Piyavi || Best Teledrama Director ||

Sumathi Awards

|-
|| 2010 ||| Piyavi || Jury Special Award ||

Directed serials

Directed films

References

1970 births
Sri Lankan film directors
Sri Lankan directors
Living people